Eleven of Gold or Onze d'Or is the nomination of the best 11 players in every season of Moroccan Botola. A trophy will be offered to all 11 players in a ceremony which must be organized by Méditel, the Telecom company who is supporting this award since 2007–2008. The players are always chosen by fans who vote by SMS.

Awards 

Footballers in Morocco
Awards established in 2002
Botola
2002 establishments in Morocco
Association football player non-biographical articles